Cecil Dixon may refer to:

 Cec Dixon (1891–1969), South African cricketer
 Cecil Dixon (cricketer) (1903–1973), Scottish cricketer
 Cecil Dixon (footballer) (born 1935), English former footballer